Dolittle (also referred to as The Voyage of Doctor Dolittle) is a 2020 American-British fantasy adventure film directed by Stephen Gaghan from a screenplay by Gaghan, Dan Gregor, and Doug Mand, based on a story by Thomas Shepherd. Dolittle is based on the title character created by Hugh Lofting and is primarily inspired by the author's second Doctor Dolittle book, The Voyages of Doctor Dolittle (1922). Robert Downey Jr. stars as the title character, alongside Antonio Banderas and Michael Sheen in live-action roles, with Emma Thompson, Rami Malek, John Cena, Kumail Nanjiani, Octavia Spencer, Tom Holland, Craig Robinson, Ralph Fiennes, Selena Gomez, and Marion Cotillard voicing an array of creatures.

It is the third iteration of film adaptions based on the character, after the 1967 musical Doctor Dolittle starring Rex Harrison and the 1998–2009 Dr. Dolittle film series starring Eddie Murphy as the titular character and later Kyla Pratt as his daughter, and the first not to be distributed by 20th Century Fox.

The project was announced in March 2017 with Downey set to star, and the rest of the cast joined over the following year. Filming began in March 2018 and lasted through June, taking place around the United Kingdom. The film underwent three weeks of reshoots in the spring of 2019, under the supervision of Jonathan Liebesman and Chris McKay after initial test screenings yielded poor results.

Universal Pictures theatrically released Dolittle in the United States on January 17, 2020. The film grossed $250 million worldwide and became the seventh-highest-grossing film of 2020, but was a box-office bomb, losing Universal as much as $50–100 million, and received generally negative reviews from critics, particularly for its humor and story. It was nominated for six Golden Raspberry Awards, including Worst Picture, winning for Worst Prequel, Remake, Rip-off or Sequel.

Plot
In Victorian era Britain, Dr. John Dolittle is a Welsh veterinarian with the ability to communicate with animals. After his wife Lily dies at sea, Dolittle retreats from human society and only tends to animals at his sanctuary that Queen Victoria gifted him. Years later, Tommy Stubbins, a young boy, accidentally wounds a red squirrel named Kevin while out with his father, and find himself led to Dolittle's home by his macaw Polynesia, who hopes his arrival will help Dolittle reconnect with humans. At the same time, Queen Victoria dispatches her maid of honor, Lady Rose, to seek Dolittle's help when she falls seriously ill. After treating Kevin, Dolittle agrees to see Victoria, after Poly reveals he will lose his home to the Treasury if the queen dies.

At her palace, Dolittle finds her being tended to by his lifelong rival, Dr. Blair Müdfly. Examining Victoria himself in the presence of Müdfly and Lord Thomas Badgley, a member of the House of Lords, he discovers she was poisoned with nightshade and can only be cured with the magical fruit from the Eden Tree. Dolittle mounts an expedition to handle this, leaving his lurcher Chip and a stick insect to keep an eye on the Queen while he is away. Although he takes along several animals for the journey, including Chee-Chee the gorilla, Yoshi the polar bear, and Poly, he refuses to take Tommy. Poly, refusing to let this happen, sends a giraffe and fox to collect Tommy, who manages to reach the ship and helps out after beginning to learn how to talk to animals, especially when Müdfly begins pursuing Dolittle to impede his efforts.

To track down the fruit, Dolittle brings his expedition to Monteverde, ruled over by Lily's father King Rassouli, to recover a journal she wrote that can help lead the way to the site where the fruit is found. However, Rassouli apprehends Dolittle when he tries to steal the journal and locks him in with a moody tiger. While Tommy works to recover the journal, Dolittle stalls the tiger until Chee-Chee locates him and finds the courage to defeat it. Although the group acquire the journal, Müdfly steals it and destroys their ship. Rassouli, learning that Dolittle is trying to honour Lily's memory with his expedition and misses her, loans a ship to him to chase after Müdfly.

Both parties eventually reach the island of the Eden Tree, only to find it is guarded by the dragon Ginko-Who-Soars. Although it attacks the groups, causing Müdfly to fall down a hole, it soon collapses from internal pain. Dolittle diagnoses and cures the dragon, causing Ginko to gratefully reward him access to the tree and its fruit. Dolittle returns in time to cure Victoria, before revealing that Badgley had poisoned her to take the crown for himself. The queen has him sent to the Tower of London for treason, thanking Dolittle for saving her. Returning home, Dolittle re-opens his home to others, while taking on Tommy as his apprentice.

Cast

 Robert Downey Jr. as Dr. John Dolittle, a Welsh widowed veterinarian who has the ability to speak to animals.
 Harry Collett as Tommy Stubbins, Dolittle's self-appointed apprentice.
 Antonio Banderas as King Rassouli, Lily's father and the king of Monteverde.
 Michael Sheen as Dr. Blair Müdfly, an old schoolmate and rival of Dolittle who gradually becomes impressed by Dolittle's special ability.
 Jim Broadbent as Lord Thomas Badgley, one of the Queen's chairmen who sends Müdfly to get the Eden Tree fruit first.
 Jessie Buckley as Queen Victoria, the Queen of the United Kingdom.
 Carmel Laniado as Lady Rose, a maid of honor to the Queen who becomes Tommy's friend and love interest.
 Kasia Smutniak as Lily Dolittle, Dolittle's deceased wife and King Rassouli's late daughter. 
 Ralph Ineson as Arnall Stubbins, Tommy's uncle.
 Joanna Page as Bethan Stubbins, Tommy's aunt.
 Sonny Ashbourne Serkis as Arnall Stubbins Jr., Tommy's cousin.
 Elliot Barnes-Worrell as Captain William Derrick, a British Captain Officer who follows Dr. Müdfly's orders.

Voice cast
 Emma Thompson as Polynesia ("Poly" for short), a wise and brave blue and yellow macaw and Dolittle's most trusted adviser.
 Rami Malek as Chee-Chee, a shy but noble mountain gorilla.
 John Cena as Yoshi, a happy-go-lucky polar bear who wears a chullo because he is always cold.
 Kumail Nanjiani as Plimpton, a mischievous and critical but well-meaning ostrich who wears striped stockings and argues with Yoshi as well as carrying Dolittle around on occasion.
 Octavia Spencer as Dab-Dab, a helpful but deluded duck with a metal leg.
 Tom Holland as Jip, a loyal lurcher who wears glasses.
 Craig Robinson as Kevin, a cheeky-chippy red squirrel with a bad attitude.
 Ralph Fiennes as Barry, an aggressive Bengal tiger with golden fangs, who lives on Monteverde and has a past with Dolittle.
 Selena Gomez as Betsy, a friendly Maasai giraffe.
 Marion Cotillard as Tutu, a French fox who is best friends with Betsy and often rides on her head. She replaces Too-Too the owl who was featured in the original Doctor Dolittle books.
 Frances de la Tour as Ginko-Who-Soars, a fire-breathing dragon who guards the magical fruits of Eden.
 Jason Mantzoukas as James, a comical damselfly.
 Nick A. Fisher as Mini, a cute sugar glider.
 Tim Treloar as Humphrey, a humpback whale that Dolittle enlists.
 Jim Carretta as Arthur, a bearded mouse who was in Dolittle's beard before it was shaved off.
 Carretta also voices Leona, an octopus that belongs to Queen Victoria.
 Ranjani Brow and Kelly Stables as The Mice.
 Scott Menville as the Army Ant.
 David Sheinkopf as Don Carpenterino, the boss ant who is Dolittle's and James' contact on Monteverde.
 Will Arnett as a hare in one of Rassouli's prison cells, who wears an eyepatch and is a friend of Barry.

Production
In March 2017, Robert Downey Jr. was cast to star in The Voyage of Doctor Dolittle, a feature adaptation of Hugh Lofting's second published Dolittle book, The Voyages of Doctor Dolittle. In December, Harry Collett and Jim Broadbent were also cast, in live-action roles. The following year in February, Antonio Banderas and Michael Sheen were added to the live-action cast, while Tom Holland, Emma Thompson, Ralph Fiennes, and Selena Gomez were cast to voice animals, including a tiger, bear, and a lioness. In March, Kumail Nanjiani, Octavia Spencer, John Cena, Rami Malek, Craig Robinson, Marion Cotillard, Frances de la Tour and Carmen Ejogo all signed on for voice roles as well. The character of Regine, a lioness voiced by Ejogo, was cut from the finished film.

Principal production commenced mid-February 2018. Live-action scenes began filming in Kirkby Lonsdale, Cumbria in May, with further location filming at South Forest, Windsor Great Park, at Cothay Manor in Stawley, Somerset and on the Menai Suspension Bridge in North West Wales, in June.

The film went 21 days of re-shoots in April 2019 following poor test screenings. Director Jonathan Liebesman helped to oversee the filming alongside Gaghan, while Chris McKay wrote new material after it became clear from first cuts that the comedy elements of the film were not coming together as well as the producers had hoped. Prior to this, Universal had turned towards Seth Rogen and Neighbors co-writer Brendan O'Brien to help add comedy to the film, but neither could remain committed to the project and dropped out. McKay was assigned to storyboard sequences and assemble different edits before later leaving to instead direct The Tomorrow War. Liebesman took over McKay's duties and finished the film alongside Gaghan. The Lego Batman Movie scribe John Whittington had also performed rewrites on the script amid reshoots, and flew to London to meet with Downey, who allegedly tore Whittington's script apart in favor of "new ideas". The Hollywood Reporter stated that despite a "challenged production", there were no fights for power and no competing cuts for the film. The film's title was changed from The Voyage of Doctor Dolittle to simply Dolittle in August.

In January 2020, on Joe Rogan's podcast The Joe Rogan Experience, Downey Jr. discussed the inspiration for the Dr. Dolittle character in the film, which he said stemmed from a Welsh neo-pagan physician called William Price: "Same way I did with Iron Man... before I signed on, I was just googling 'weirdest Welsh doctor', I just wanted to think of, I don't want to just do another English accent.. so there was this guy called William Price, who's a nutty Welsh doctor, he was a neo-druidist, he believed that he could communicate with all nature and all that stuff, so I sent a picture of this wild looking guy wearing this kind of suit with stars on it and like a staff in his hand [to Gaghan]... and he goes, "That looks good to me" and I was like "great let's do this movie"".

Music artist Sia performed a new song of hers, "Original", for the end credits, while Danny Elfman composed the film's score.

Release

Theatrical
The film was released by Universal Pictures. It was originally set for May 24, 2019, but was moved to April 12 of that year, to avoid competition with Star Wars: The Rise of Skywalker, which itself was later moved from May to December 20, 2019. The film was later moved again to January 17, 2020.

Home media
Dolittle was released on Digital HD on March 24, 2020, and on DVD, Blu-ray, and Ultra HD Blu-ray on April 7. As of July 12, 2020, the film had made $14.3 million in home media sales.

Reception

Box office
Dolittle grossed $77 million in the United States and Canada, and $174 million in other territories, for a worldwide total of $251 million, against a production budget of $175 million. Due to its high production and marketing costs, The New York Observer estimated that the film needed to gross over $500 million worldwide to break even; following its debut weekend, it was estimated the film would lose Universal between $50–100 million.

In the United States and Canada, the film was released alongside Bad Boys for Life, and was projected to gross $20–22 million from 4,155 theaters in its three-day opening weekend, and a total of around $27 million over the full four-day Martin Luther King Jr. Day weekend. It made $6.3 million on its first day, including $925,000 from Thursday night previews. It went on to debut to $22 million for three days, and $29.5 million over the four-day frame, finishing second, behind Bad Boys for Life. The film made $12.1 million in its second weekend and $7.7 million in its third, remaining in second both times.

After months of delays, the film was released in China on July 24, and made $5.2 million from about 3,000 screens in its opening weekend. By August 6, the film had reached $14.6 million in grosses in the country.

Critical response
The site's critics consensus reads: "Dolittle may be enough to entertain very young viewers, but they deserve better than this rote adaptation's jumbled story and stale humor". On Metacritic, the film has a weighted average score of 26 out of 100, based on 46 critics, indicating "generally unfavorable reviews". Audiences polled by CinemaScore gave the film an average grade of "B" on an A+ to F scale, while PostTrak reported an average of 3 out of 5 stars from viewers they surveyed.

Courtney Howard of Variety called the film a "frenetic, crass kids' flick" and wrote: "What should have been an awe-filled adventure quickly curdles into an awful one, thanks to a pedestrian formula and the filmmakers' fixation on fart jokes". Writing for The Hollywood Reporter, Todd McCarthy said: "From the very first scene, it's clear something is terribly off with this lavishly misbegotten attempt to repopularize an animal-loaded literary franchise that was born exactly a century ago. The oddly diffident star and executive producer Robert Downey Jr. never finds the power-supplying third rail needed to energize a tale that fails to make a real case for being reinterpreted".

British critic Mark Kermode gave the film a negative review: "Terrible script. Terrible visuals. Dull plot. Dismal gags. The fact (is) that at 101 minutes it really, really tested one's patience. It is shockingly poor". In examining the film's ending, Douglas Laman of Screen Rant noted that the film as a whole suffered from numerous problems, including "...Dolittle's new backstory involving a deceased wife...the largely lifeless voice-over work of the animal characters [and] its painfully unfunny comedy".

Much of the criticism focused on Robert Downey Jr.'s portrayal of the character with a Welsh accent, which the actor himself called "the single hardest accent on Earth". Mark Kermode derided the attempt comparing it unfavourably with Welsh actor Michael Sheen's English accent, calling it "something from Mars" and suggesting the film had been heavily dubbed. Welsh reviewers were more mixed. Simon Thompson praised the attempt, stating "it's a brave choice, I take my hat off to Robert Downey Jr. for going for it" and "as flawed as it is, it warmed the cockles of my heart to hear a Welsh accent in the cinema". Another Welsh reviewer said that appraisal of the accent "depends on how much love you have for him in attempting to do it in the first place", arguing that he had "clearly swotted up on the dialect, dropping in random phrases like "tidy" and "mun", along with "I'll be there in a minute now" and "twty down"".

A segment in the film in which Dolittle removes bagpipes from Ginko-Who-Soars' anus, inducing a rather obnoxious amount of flatulence, was criticised as "gross" and "disgusting".

Accolades

References

External links

 
 
 

2020 films
2020 fantasy films
2020 adventure films
2020s fantasy adventure films
2020s children's adventure films
2020s American films
American children's fantasy films
Doctor Dolittle films
2020s English-language films
Films about animals
Films based on children's books
Films directed by Stephen Gaghan
Films scored by Danny Elfman
Films set in 1819
Films set in England
Films shot in England
Films shot at Shepperton Studios
Films shot in Wales
Films with screenplays by Stephen Gaghan
Films using motion capture
Reboot films
Universal Pictures films
Cultural depictions of Queen Victoria on film
Films set in the 1810s
Films about dragons
Golden Raspberry Award winning films